The 2015 Women's  World Junior Squash Championships is the women's edition of the 2015 World Junior Squash Championships, which serves as the individual world Junior championship for squash players. The event took place in Eindhoven in the Netherlands from 26 to 30 July 2015. Nouran Gohar won her first World Junior Open title, defeating Habiba Mohamed in the final.

Seeds

Draw and results

Finals

Top half

Section 1

Section 2

Bottom half

Section 1

Section 2

See also
2015 Men's World Junior Squash Championships
2015 Women's World Junior Team Squash Championships
British Junior Open Squash
World Junior Squash Championships

References

External links
Women's World Junior Championships 2015 official website

2015 in women's squash
World Junior Squash Championships
Wor
2015 in Dutch sport
Squash tournaments in the Netherlands
International sports competitions hosted by the Netherlands